The Swimming competition at the 2nd Pan American Games was held in Mexico City, Mexico during the Games' run in 1955. It consisted of 16 long course (50m) events: 8 for males and 8 for females.

Results

Men

Women

Medal table

References